Jarrod Thomas Marrs (born May 28, 1975) is an American competition swimmer who specialized in breaststroke events.  He twice competed at the Pan American Games (1999 and 2003), winning a silver medal in the men's 100-meter breaststroke in both, and won a gold medal at the 2000 FINA Short Course World Championships as a member of the first-place U.S. team in the 4x100-meter medley relay.  While he was a college student at Louisiana State University (LSU), he competed for the LSU Tigers swimming and diving team.

He is an assistant swimming coach for the University of Houston.

References

External links
 USA Swimming profile 
 University of Houston profile 
 Jarrod Marrs at U.S. Masters Swimming

1975 births
Living people
American male breaststroke swimmers
Swimmers at the 1999 Pan American Games
Swimmers at the 2003 Pan American Games
LSU Tigers swimmers
Sportspeople from Baton Rouge, Louisiana
Houston Cougars swimming coaches
Medalists at the FINA World Swimming Championships (25 m)
Pan American Games silver medalists for the United States
Pan American Games medalists in swimming
Goodwill Games medalists in swimming
Competitors at the 2001 Goodwill Games
Medalists at the 1999 Pan American Games
Medalists at the 2003 Pan American Games